Shuhan-e Sofla (also Romanized as Shūhān-e Soflá and Showhān-e Soflá; also known as Shūān, Shūfān, Shūhān, and Shian) is a village in Homeyl Rural District, Homeyl District, Eslamabad-e Gharb County, Kermanshah Province, and Iran. At the 2006 census, its population was 163, in 44 families.

References 

Populated places in Eslamabad-e Gharb County